Dichomeris turgida is a moth in the family Gelechiidae. It was described by Edward Meyrick in 1918. It is found in South Africa.

The forewings are whitish ochreous with a small black mark on the base of the costa. The stigmata are small, dark fuscous, the first discal represented by a short linear dash, the plical slightly beyond this. The costa is slenderly dark fuscous from two-fifths to the apex, cut by a whitish line which runs from two-thirds of the costa to near the apex and then strongly curved to the tornus, and posteriorly by three oblique whitish strigulae. There is a fine whitish terminal line marked with several small blackish dots, the space between this and the preceding line brownish-tinged. The hindwings are grey.

References

Endemic moths of South Africa
Moths described in 1918
turgida